Ryu Jun-yeol (born September 25, 1986) is a South Korean actor, activist, and photographer. Ryu began his acting career in independent films, and then rose to prominence through his breakthrough role in the critically acclaimed television series Reply 1988 (2015–2016), the highest-rated drama in Korean cable television history at the time, which also led to him winning various Best New Actor Awards in South Korea. Known as a prolific Chungmu-ro actor, since then he has starred in the box-office hit films The King (2017), A Taxi Driver (2017), Little Forest (2018), Believer (2018), Money (2019), The Battle: Roar to Victory (2019), and The Night Owl (2022).

Ryu has received numerous accolades throughout his career, including nominations for Baeksang Arts Awards, Blue Dragon Film Awards, Buil Film Awards, Chunsa Film Art Awards, London East Asian Film Festival and New York Asian Film Festival. In addition to his film work, Ryu actively engages in social and environmental activism. He has been recognised by Forbes Korea as one of the most powerful celebrities in South Korea, placing on the listing for three consecutive years, fourteenth in 2017, thirty-sixth in 2018, and eleventh in 2019.

Early life and education
Ryu was born on September 25, 1986, in Suwon, South Korea. He is the eldest and has a sister who is two years his junior. He graduated from University of Suwon majoring in Film under a scholarship. While studying at the university, Ryu took on many part-time jobs, working as a pizza delivery person, a day labourer, an after-school tutor, and more. Ryu was conscripted before debuting as an actor. He registered as a public officer in 2007 and completed his duties in 2009.

Career

2012–2014: Beginnings 
In 2012, Ryu started acting in short films and independent film productions, before being cast in a bit part in the 2013 feature film INGtoogi: The Battle of Internet Trolls.

2015–2017: Rising popularity and breakthrough 
Ryu first drew attention for his breakout performance in his debut feature film, Socialphobia in 2015, which earned him Rising star award at KAFA Film Festival and other nominations from Chunsa Film Art Awards. Later that year, Ryu gained widespread public recognition through starring in the popular teen series Reply 1988, alongside Lee Hye-ri, Park Bo-gum, Go Kyung-pyo, and Lee Dong-hwi. His portrayal of one of the leads, Kim Jung-hwan, won him many accolades, including the Best New Actor in TV award at the 52nd Baeksang Arts Awards in 2016.

In 2016, Ryu starred in the coming-of-age film One Way Trip and crime thriller No Tomorrow. The same year, he played his first leading role in romantic-comedy Lucky Romance alongside Hwang Jung-eum.

In 2017, Ryu featured in political crime drama film The King alongside Jo In-sung and Jung Woo-sung, which became the 7th highest-grossing South Korean film of the year and for which he won the Best New Actor in Film award at the 53rd Baeksang Arts Awards. The same year, he featured in biopic A Taxi Driver with veteran actors Song Kang-ho and Yoo Hae-jin, which became the highest grossing Korean film of the year and the twelfth highest-grossing South Korean film in history. Ryu also appeared in legal thriller Heart Blackened alongside Choi Min-sik and Park Shin-hye.

2018-present: Prominence in film and high-profile roles
In 2018, Ryu starred in the critically acclaimed drama film Little Forest with Kim Tae-ri, and headlined the crime action film Believer with Cho Jin-woong . Believer was a box-office hit, becoming the first Korean film to surpass five million admissions in 2018. It was the fourth highest-grossing film of the year in South Korea.

In 2019, Ryu starred in the action thriller film Hit-and-Run Squad with Gong Hyo-jin directed by Han Jun-hee, lead the crime film Money alongside Yoo Ji-tae and historical action film The Battle: Roar to Victory directed by Won Shin-yun. All three films performed well at the box-office, with The Battle: Roar to Victory and Money eventually becoming the 5th and 9th highest grossing Korean films of the year respectively. Ryu's continuous big screen success earned him a spot in Forbes Korea Power Celebrity for two consecutive years, 36th in 2018 and 11th in 2019.

In 2021, Ryu starred in JTBC's "Tenth Anniversary Special Project", a Hur Jin-ho melodrama television series Lost with Jeon Do-yeon, marking his small screen comeback after five years. 

In 2022, Ryu headlined Choi Dong-hoon's sci-fi action fantasy film, Alienoid, reuniting with Kim Tae-ri. The film premiered in July 2022. Despite the film not being a commercial success, Ryu's performance was praised by critics. In November, Ryu starred in the historical-thriller film The Night Owl, reuniting with Yoo Hae-jin.

Upcoming roles
Ryu is set to feature as a lead in psychological thriller drama Money Game along with actress Chun Woo-hee and actor Park Jeong-min, reuniting with director Han Jae-rim.

Other works

Philanthropy 
Ryu is an environmental activist. While filming Youth Over Flowers: Africa in 2016, Ryu developed an interest in environmentalism and began to campaign for environmental protection. In December 2018, Ryu was reported to have donated ₩10 million to Greenpeace, a non-governmental environmental organisation. He has been making regular donations since 2016 for various campaigns, such as Save the Arctic. In 2020, Ryu made yet another donation to Greenpeace in response to Australian wildfires, and campaigned for animal protection and urgent action to tackle climate change on his Instagram account. 

In 2021, Ryu participated in a video conference with South Korean President Moon Jae-in, speaking about environmental protection and bringing attention to the Greenpeace campaign to reduce plastic packaging. The two had previously visited the DMZ Peace Trail in 2019 to mark the first anniversary of the Panmunjom Declaration.

Photography 
Ryu took a brief hiatus from acting and moved to the United States of America, living in Los Angeles for several months from mid-2019 to early 2020, going by his English name Anthony. He attended the University of California, Los Angeles for a study abroad programme. Apart from his studies, he did photography work and learned vlogging in his spare time. He established a mini vlog-series on YouTube, titled ‘Ryu Jun Yeol’s: Reportage’, which covered his life in Los Angeles. In November 2020, Ryu held his first photo exhibition in Seoul, titled "Once Upon A Time... In Hollywood", which showcased the photos he took while living abroad.

Personal life 

Ryu has been in a relationship with singer and actress Lee Hye-ri since late 2016, whom he met while filming Reply 1988 where he played as the second lead who fell in love with his childhood best friend.

Ryu is an avid football fan. He is best friends with Tottenham Hotspur player Son Heung-min, and has participated in promotional activities for the 2017 FIFA U-20 World Cup, which was held in South Korea. Ahead of the tournament, Ryu played against Argentine football players Diego Maradona and Pablo Aimar in a five-a-side match held before the official U-20 World Cup draw in Suwon.

Filmography

Film

Television series

Web series

Television shows

Hosting

Music video appearances

Discography

Singles

Awards and nominations

State honors

Listicles

Notes

References

External links

 Ryu Jun-yeol at C-JeS Entertainment 

1986 births
Living people
21st-century South Korean male actors
South Korean male film actors
South Korean male television actors
People from Suwon
University of Suwon alumni
Best New Actor Paeksang Arts Award (television) winners
Best New Actor Paeksang Arts Award (film) winners